Hitler Lives (also known as Hitler Lives?) is a 1945 American short documentary film directed by Don Siegel, who was uncredited. The film won an Oscar at the 18th Academy Awards in 1946 for Documentary Short Subject. Earlier the same year, Siegel made his directorial debut on another short film Star in the Night (1945), which also won an Academy Award. The film's copyright was renewed.

Production
Hitler Lives is based on the film Your Job in Germany, which was produced shortly before the end of World War II in Europe and written by Theodor Geisel (better known as Dr. Seuss).

While retaining some of the original film footage, Hitler Lives was written by Saul Elkins. The film warns that the defeated German population still contains Nazi supporters and that the world must stay ever vigilant against the prospect that a new Hitler will arise within Germany. The film combines dramatized content mixed with archive footage. The crematoriums of a concentration camp are shown, only using "victims" to describe those murdered (without mentioning that they were Jewish). Finally, the film warns against fascism in the United States.

Cast
 Knox Manning as narrator (voice)
 Joseph Goebbels as himself (archive footage) (uncredited)
 Adolf Hitler as himself (archive footage) (uncredited)
 Joseph Stalin as himself (archive footage) (uncredited)
 Harry S. Truman as himself (archive footage) (uncredited)

References

External links
 
 
 
 

1945 films
1945 short films
American black-and-white films
American documentary films
Films directed by Don Siegel
Best Documentary Short Subject Academy Award winners
Warner Bros. short films
Films about Nazis
Films about Nazism
1945 documentary films
1940s English-language films
1940s American films